The 1990 Toronto Argonauts finished in second place in the East Division with a 10–8 record. They appeared in the Eastern Final. After being the CFL's passing leader (331-for-597 for 4,509 yards) in 1989 Matt Dunigan was in another blockbuster six-for-one player trade that sent him to the Argonauts. During Dunigan's first season with the Argonauts, he helped guide the second most prolific scoring offense in the history of the Canadian Football League to 689 points or 38.3 points per contest.

Offseason

Regular season

Standings

Schedule

Postseason

Awards and honours
CFL's Most Outstanding Player – Michael "Pinball" Clemons

1990 CFL All-Stars
SB – Darrell Smith, CFL All-Star
OG – Dan Ferrone, CFL All-Star
DT – Harold Hallman, CFL All-Star
DB – Don Wilson, CFL All-Star
ST – Michael "Pinball" Clemons, CFL All-Star

References

Toronto Argonauts seasons